Battleford-Cut Knife was a provincial electoral district for the Legislative Assembly of Saskatchewan, Canada. This constituency was created by the merging of parts of the Cut Knife-Lloydminster and The Battlefords electoral districts before the 1995 Saskatchewan general election. The Representation Act, 2002 (Saskatchewan) redistributed this riding into the Cut Knife-Turtleford and a revived The Battlefords electoral districts for the 2003 Saskatchewan general election.

Member of the Legislative Assembly

Election results

|-

|Prog. Conservative
|Eileen Sword
|align="right"|1,940
|align="right"|26.79
|align="right"|–

|Independent
|Leona Tootoosis
|align="right"|154
|align="right"|2.12
|align="right"|–
|- bgcolor="white"
!align="left" colspan=3|Total
!align="right"|7,239
!align="right"|100.00
!align="right"|

|-

|- bgcolor="white"
!align="left" colspan=3|Total
!align="right"|6,787
!align="right"|100.00
!align="right"|

|-

|- bgcolor="white"
!align="left" colspan=3|Total
!align="right"|5,040
!align="right"|48.92
!align="right"|

See also
Electoral district (Canada)
List of Saskatchewan provincial electoral districts
List of Saskatchewan general elections
List of political parties in Saskatchewan

References
 Saskatchewan Archives Board: Saskatchewan Executive and Legislative Directory
 Elections Saskatchewan: Historical By-Elections

Former provincial electoral districts of Saskatchewan
Cut Knife No. 439, Saskatchewan